Elizabeth of Holstein-Rendsburg (c. 1300 – before 1340) was the regent of the Duchy of Saxe-Lauenburg during the minority of her son from 1321 until 1330. She was by two consecutive marriages, duchess of Saxe-Lauenburg and queen of Denmark by marriage (1330-1331) to Eric Christoffersen, son of Christopher II of Denmark.

Life

A member of the House of Schauenburg, Elizabeth was the daughter of Henry I, Count of Holstein-Rendsburg, and Heilwig of Bronckhorst. Her first husband was John II, Duke of Saxe-Lauenburg, whom she married in c. 1315. Elizabeth gave birth to a son who succeeded her husband as Albert IV, Duke of Saxe-Lauenburg, but she ruled the duchy as regent due to his minority.

In 1330, Duchess Elizabeth married Eric, junior king of Denmark, the son of her brother Gerhard's enemy, King Christopher II of Denmark. The couple had no children and the marriage was dissolved the next year. Her former husband died in war with Holstein in 1332.

References 
Elisabeth

1300 births
1340 deaths
House of Schauenburg
Duchesses of Saxe-Lauenburg
Danish royal consorts
14th-century women rulers
14th-century Danish nobility
14th-century Danish women
14th-century German nobility
14th-century German women
Daughters of monarchs
Remarried royal consorts